Donald Lipski (born May 21, 1947) is an American sculptor best known for his installation work and large-scale public works.

Early life and education
Donald Lipski was born in Chicago, Illinois in 1947. He was raised in the northern suburb of Highland Park, the son and grandson of bicycle dealers. Although his first welded sculptures as a teen won him The Scholastic Art Award in high school, he was a history major and anti-war activist at the University of Wisconsin–Madison, earning a B.A. in American History in 1970. In Madison, Lipski discovered ceramics while working with well-known ceramics artist Don Reitz. He then pursued an MFA in ceramics from Cranbrook Academy of Art in 1973, where he studied with Richard DeVore and Michael Hall. Lipski taught at the University of Oklahoma from 1973 to 1977, when he moved to New York.

Art career
Lipski attained growing recognition with his early installation Gathering Dust, which comprised thousands of tiny sculptures pinned to the wall, first at New York gallery Artists Space in 1978, and soon after in Museum of Modern Art as part of the Project series. In 1978 he won the first of three National Endowment for the Arts grants, followed by a Guggenheim Fellowship in 1988, an award from the American Academy of Arts and Letters in 1993, and the Rome Prize of The American Academy in Rome in 2000. He is permanently conserved in the New York Metropolitan Museum of Art, the Corcoran Gallery of Art in Washington, D.C., The Art Institute of Chicago, and dozens of other museums.

Lipski's installation works continued in the 1990s with The Bells, at the Contemporary Arts Center in Cincinnati, The Starry Night, at Capp Street Project, San Francisco, Pieces of String Too Short to Save, in the Grand Lobby of The Brooklyn Museum, NY), and The Cauldron at the Parrish Art Museum, Southampton, New York.

In recent years, Lipski has focused his efforts on creating large-scale works for public spaces. Some of his most recognizable works include The Yearling, outside the Denver Public Library (originally exhibited by The Public Art Fund at Doris Freedman Plaza, Central Park, New York, 1997), Sirshasana, hanging in the Grand Central Market, Grand Central Terminal in New York City, and F.I.S.H. at the San Antonio River Walk, in Texas. There are twenty others across the U.S.

In 2012, Lipski was living and working in Philadelphia, Pennsylvania. He is represented by Galerie Lelong in New York.

Public collections 

 Asian American Art Center, New York
 Brooklyn Museum, New York, New York
 Chicago Art Institute
 Cincinnati Art Museum
 Corcoran Gallery of Art, Washington, D.C.
 Dayton Art Institute, Dayton, Ohio
 Denver Art Museum, Denver, Colorado
 Denver Public Library, Denver, Colorado
 Detroit Institute of Art, Detroit, Michigan
 Indianapolis Museum of Art, Indianapolis, Indiana
 Jewish Museum, New York, New York
 Kansas City Public Library's Plaza Branch, Kansas City, Missouri
 Landmarks (University of Texas at Austin), Austin, Texas
 Laumeier Sculpture Park, St. Louis, Missouri
 Miami Art Museum
 Menil Collection, Houston, Texas
 Metropolitan Museum of Art, New York, New York
 Minneapolis Museum of Fine Art, Minneapolis, Minnesota
 Museum of Contemporary Art, Chicago
 Museum of Contemporary Art, Los Angeles
 Museum of Fine Arts, Boston, Massachusetts
 Museum of Fine Arts, Houston, Texas
 Museum of Modern Art, Miami
 New Orleans Museum of Art, New Orleans, Louisiana
 North Carolina Museum of Art, Raleigh
 Raymond Nasher Sculpture Collection, Dallas, Texas
 Panza Collection, Italy
 Phoenix Museum of Art, Phoenix, Arizona
 Museum of Contemporary Art, San Diego, California
 Walker Art Center, Minneapolis, Minnesota
 Whitney Museum of American Art, New York, New York
 Witherspoon Museum of Art, Greensboro, NC
 Yale University Art Gallery

Bibliography 
 Donald Lipski, retrospective catalogue, The Bawag Foundation, Vienna, 1999-2000 (text David Levy Strauss).
 Arnason, H.H. History of Modern Art. 3rd ed. New York: Harry N. Abrams Inc, 1986.
 Bellamy, Peter. The Artist Project. New York: IN Publishing, 1991.
 Heartney, Eleanor, et al. The Refco Collection. Chicago: Refco Group Ltd, 1990.
 Pradel, Jean Louis, ed. World Art Trends 1983/84. New York: Harry N. Abrams Inc, 1984.
 King, Elain. "Donald Lipski" in Artists Observed. Edited by Harvey Sten. New York: Harry N. Abrams Inc, 1986, pp. 38–39.
 Fleischman, Stephen, and Terrie Sultan. Donald Lipski: A Brief History of Twine. Madison, WI: Madison Art Center, 2000.
 Richer, Francesca and Matthew Rosenzweig eds. No. 1: First Works by 362 Artists. New York: Distributed Art Publishers, 2005.
 Bloodworth, Sandra and William Ayres.  Along the Way. New York: The Monacelli Press, 2006.

Further reading 
 Freedman Gallery, Albright College. Donald Lipski: Poetic Sculpture. Reading, PA, 1990. Text by David S. Rubin.
 Hillwood Art Gallery, Long Island University. Broken Wings: Donald Lipski at Grumman. Brookville, NY, 1987. Text by Judy Collischan Van Wagner.
 Kaufman, Leslie. "Appreciating the Physical World: A Conversation with Donald Lipski." Sculpture, 26, (November 2007): 28–35.
 Kuspit, Donald. Donald Lipski: Building Steam. New York: Germans Van Eck Gallery, 1985.
 Princenthal, Nancy. "Reweaving Old Glory." Art in America, 79, (May 1991): 136–41, 182.
 Saunders, Wade. "Talking Objects: Interviews with Ten Younger Sculptors." Art in America, 73, (November 1985): 110–37.
 Southeastern Center for Contemporary Art. Donald Lipski: Oral History. Winston-Salem, NC, 1994.
 Yau, John. Donald Lipski: Who's Afraid of Red, White, and Blue? Philadelphia: Fabric Workshop, 1991.
 Riley, Jan. Donald Lipski: The Bells. Contemporary Art Center, Cincinnati, Ohio, 1991.

Public commissions

References 

1947 births
Living people
20th-century American Jews
American male sculptors
Jewish sculptors
20th-century American sculptors
20th-century American male artists
21st-century American sculptors
21st-century American male artists
Sculptors from Illinois
Artists from Chicago
People from Highland Park, Illinois
University of Wisconsin–Madison College of Letters and Science alumni
Cranbrook Academy of Art alumni
University of Oklahoma faculty
21st-century American Jews